The Office of the Secretary to the Government was tasked with administering cabinet concerns, security, establishments, home affairs, and information when the newly constituted Lagos State took off administratively in April 1968.  The responsibility for information service was transferred to the military Governor's office as the business of governance got more complex. 

In essence, the ministry changed its name from the Secretary of State's Office to the Military Government. 

With Mr. Badmus as the first Commissioner, it eventually grew into a full-fledged Ministry of Information and Tourism. In April 1971, the Ministry of Information was founded as a separate entity on Victoria Island to handle government contact with the public and the press.

The Lagos State Ministry of Information and Strategy is the state government ministry, charged with the responsibility to plan, devise and implement the state policies on Information and Strategy.

The Ministry was restructured and reorganized in November 2015, under the administration of Governor Akinwunmi Ambode, via Lagos state government  circular No.141 dated November 9, 2015, which changed some of the names of existing departments, created a new department, and changed the nomenclature of the Ministry's officers. As a result of this move, all officers in the Ministry who were previously known as "Information Officers" have been renamed "Public Affairs Officers." While the departments are currently referred to as:

 Public Enlightenment & Community Relations
 Information Production
 ICT/Social Media (New)
 Public Affairs Department (Formally called Press and Public Relations)
 Administration/Human Resources (Formally called Finance& Admin.)
 Strategy

CHANGING MINISTERIAL NOMENCLATURE [1971-TILL DATE] 

 Ministry of Information and Tourism under Brig. Gen. Mobolaji Johnson
 Ministry of Information and tourism under Late Captain Adekunle Lawal
 Ministry of Information and tourism under Cmdr. Ndubusi kanu
 Publicity Department, Governor’s Office under Alhaji Lateef Jakande
 Ministry of Information, Social Development, Youth, Sports, and Culture under Air Cmdr. Gbolahan Mudashiru
 Ministry of Information and Culture under Navy Captain Mike Akhigbe
 Ministry of Information and Culture under Col. Raji Rasaki
 Bureau of Information under Sir Micheal Agbolade Otedola
 Ministry of Information, Culture and Sports, under Col. Olagunsoye Oyinlola
 Ministry of Information, Culture and Sports under Col. Mohammed Buba Marwa
 Ministry of Information and Strategy under Asiwaju Bola Ahmed Tinubu
 Ministry of Information and Strategy under Mr. Babatunde Raji Fashola
 Ministry of Information and Strategy under Mr. Akinwumi Ambode
 Ministry of Information and Strategy under Babajide Sanwo-Olu

STATUTORY RESPONSIBILITIES 

 Publicity and Mass Media
 Public Relation of Government
 Registration of newspapers \ magazines
 Archives matters
 Publishing and Advertising
 Management of Information on the website of the Lagos State Government.

Impact 
In January 2021,The Lagos State Government increased public campaigning and sensitization in response to the emergence of the second wave of COVID-19. This was accomplished by engagement between Ministry of Information and Strategy officials, led by Toyin Adeni-Awosika, Director of Public Enlightenment, and members of the public.

Members of the public were approached at markets, auto mechanic workshops, garages, and parks in Agege, Ojota, Ikeja, Ogba, Alausa Secretariat, and surrounding areas by the sensitization team. They spoke to the crowd and solicited input, as well as distributing vital information, education, and communication items such as fliers and posters.

See also
Lagos State Ministry of Women Affairs and Poverty Alleviation
Lagos State Executive Council

References

Government ministries of Lagos State